James Dinneen Nealon Jr. (born 1954) is an American diplomat who served as United States Ambassador to Honduras from 2014 to 2017. After his service as ambassador, he worked in the Department of Homeland Security from 2017 to 2018.

Biography 

Born in Virginia, the son of a land surveyor, Nealon studied history at Brown University before studying at Boston College.

A career Foreign Service officer, Nealon held posts in Canada, Uruguay, Hungary, Spain, and Chile before assuming his post as Ambassador to Honduras in August 2014; Nealon also served as the deputy of John F. Kelly, whilst Kelly was in charge of the United States Southern Command.

After leaving his ambassadorship in 2017, Nealon was appointed assistant secretary for international engagement at the Department of Homeland Security by Kelly in July. During his time as assistant secretary, Nealon supported a policy of deploying Homeland Security agents abroad. He resigned his post on February 8, 2018, due to his disagreements with the immigration policy of Donald Trump, and, specifically, the withdrawal of temporary protected status for Hondurans.

References

External links 
 James D. Nealon at the archived United States Department of State website.
 James D. Nealon at the Office of the Historian website.

United States Department of State officials
Ambassadors of the United States to Honduras
Living people
Brown University alumni
1954 births
United States Foreign Service personnel